The 1955 Men's World Weightlifting Championships were held in Munich, West Germany, from October 12 to October 16, 1955. There were 108 men in action from 25 nations.

Medal summary

Medal table

References
Results (Sport 123)
Weightlifting World Championships Seniors Statistics

External links
International Weightlifting Federation

World Weightlifting Championships
World Weightlifting Championships
International sports competitions hosted by West Germany
International weightlifting competitions hosted by Germany
World Weightlifting Championships
October 1955 sports events in Europe